Donald D. Van Etten (born March 10, 1934) is an American former politician. He served in the South Dakota House of Representatives from 2001 to 2008.

References

1934 births
Living people
People from Orange City, Iowa
Politicians from Rapid City, South Dakota
Physicians from South Dakota
Republican Party members of the South Dakota House of Representatives